Caroline Hirsch is the founder and owner of the  New York comedy club Carolines on Broadway and the New York Comedy Festival. She is recognized for her ability to spot rising comedic talent including Jerry Seinfeld and Paul Reubens.

Early life 
Hirsch was born in 1952 and grew up in Flatbush, Brooklyn.  She says the first standup act she ever saw was when she snuck into a 1967 George Carlin gig at The Bitter End in Greenwich Village. After living in Brooklyn, she would later move to Manhattan She attended City College and the Fashion Institute of Technology (FIT). After school she went to work at Gimbels until she became unemployed.

Career 
While collecting unemployment  a few friends approached her about opening up a cabaret club which she eventually accepted. The club opened in 1982 but she realized that the cabaret theme was not working and decided to turn it into a comedy club instead which brought in a younger clientele that was more profitable. In the late 80's the A&E network asked her to produce a comedy special which became Carolines Comedy Hour which was produced by her production company Pinky Ring Productions. The show won a CableACE award for Best Stand-Up Comedy Series. In November 2004, Hirsch launched the New York Comedy Festival, with Jarrod Moses, a weeklong comedy festival that features comedy’s biggest stars performing in New York’s most prestigious venues including Carnegie Hall, Lincoln Center, Harlem’s World Famous Apollo Theater, Madison Square Garden, Town Hall and Carolines on Broadway.  She currently lives in a duplex with views of the East River.

Charity work 
Hirsch serves as a board member of the Creative Coalition and implemented the highly successful "Stand-Up for Class" program in both the New York City and Los Angeles public school systems. She is also a board member of the Times Square Alliance (formerly the Times Business Improvement District); NYC & Company, the city’s official tourism marketing organization; the board of The Association for the Help of Retarded Children; and the national advisory board of Count Me In, a micro lending organization for women. Additionally, she formerly sat on the board of the Ms. Foundation for Women.  During her tenure on the Ms. Foundation for Women board, Hirsch created the successful "Take Our Daughters to Work" initiative.

In 2006, Hirsch produced "Roasted, Battered and Fried," a roast of Mario Batali to benefit the Food Bank For New York City, which took place at Capitale as part the third annual New York Comedy Festival (NYCF).  In 2007, Hirsch created "Stand Up for Heroes" to benefit the Bob Woodruff Foundation, an annual event that takes place during the NYCF which has featured performances by Bill Cosby, Ricky Gervais, Jerry Seinfeld, Jon Stewart, Bruce Springsteen, Roger Waters and John Mayer, among others.  To date, "Stand Up for Heroes" has raised more than $20 million.  In 2011, Hirsch produced "On the Chopping Block:  A Roast of Anthony Bourdain" as part of the New York City Wine & Food Festival.  The event helped raise money for the Food Bank for New York City and Share Our Strength's "No Kid Hungry" campaign.

Awards and honors 
Hirsch was honored with the New York Police Athletic League’s Woman of the Year Award, the Ms. Foundation’s Philanthropic Vision Award and the National Association of Women Business Owners’ Signature Award for Lifetime Achievement. She also received the Leadership in Tourism Award from the NYC & Company Foundation.   In 2011, Hirsch was the recipient of Variety's "Comedy Legend & Groundbreaker Award" and in 2013 was named as one of Crain's New York Business's "Movers & Shakers."

References
Notes

American businesspeople
American comedy
1952 births
People from Flatbush, Brooklyn
Living people
Fashion Institute of Technology alumni